The men's bantamweight event was part of the boxing programme at the 1952 Summer Olympics.  The weight class was the second-lightest contested, and allowed boxers of up to 54 kilograms. The competition was held from 28 July to 2 August 1952. 23 boxers from 23 nations competed.

Medalists

Results

References

Bantamweight